The 1921 Drake Bulldogs football team was an American football team that represented Drake University as a member of the Missouri Valley Conference (MVC) during the 1921 college football season. In its first season under head coach Ossie Solem, the team compiled a 5–2 record (2–2 against MVC opponents), finished fourth in the conference, and outscored opponents by a total of 149 to 40.

Schedule

References

Drake
Drake Bulldogs football seasons
Drake Bulldogs football